Dil Kya Kare (English: What Should The Heart Do?) is a 1999 Indian drama film, directed by Prakash Jha and produced by Veeru Devgan and Veena Devgan. The film stars Ajay Devgn, Mahima Chaudhry, Kajol and Chandrachur Singh.

Plot
This story is about tragic love which begins in tragedy and ends in tragedy.

Anand (Ajay Devgn) lives happily with his wife Kavita (Mahima Chaudhry) and Neha, whom the couple adopted because Kavita suffered a miscarriage. Kavita is good friends with Som Datt (Chandrachur Singh), whose love for her has remained unrequited since their college days.

A lady starts stalking Neha and meets her up daily at school. After some time, she befriends Neha and Neha starts calling her "sweet Aunty" and introduces her to her mother Kavita, who invites her home.

The stranger introduces herself as "Nandita" (Kajol) and requests to spend more time with Neha. So Kavita lets her stay in their home as a guest for some time. However, deeply buried secrets threaten to surface when Nandita and Anand come face-to-face as it is revealed that they are the biological parents of Neha.

Their short-lived tragic history is revealed: Anand and Nandita were traveling by train when thugs took over and tried to rape/kill Nandita. Anand saved Nandita's life and the two became attracted and made love. They did not meet after this night.

Anand moved on with his life while a pregnant Nandita was forced to give up her child (Neha) for adoption.

Anand and Nandita try to hide their past from Kavita at first, though Anand tries many times to meet with Nandita alone and talk to her, anxious to know why and where she mysteriously disappeared even though he tried to find her.

However, Kavita finds out the truth and is disgusted with Anand and Nandita. Kavita leaves her home in the middle of the night with Som. Feeling betrayed, Kavita is contemplating leaving Anand forever. In the meantime, Anand and Nandita enjoy a fun day out with Neha at her insistence. After a spat at Som's house, Kavita finally realises her husband's true nature and files for divorce.

At the courthouse, Anand begs Kavita to reconsider. Nandita promises to leave the family alone on one condition – that she take Neha with her. Kavita becomes frantic, as she refuses to give up Neha, and Anand reluctantly supports Kavita after realizing how desperate she is to keep Neha.

When Nandita realizes that Anand and Kavita love Neha and are not ready to give her up, she decides to leave her daughter in their care and go away forever.

Anand is shocked at this and runs to the train station. He makes it just in time to see Nandita on the moving train, peering at him with tearful eyes.

Cast
 Ajay Devgan as Anand Kishore
 Kajol as Nandita Rai
 Mahima Chaudhry as Kavita Kishore
 Chandrachur Singh as Som Dutt
 Farida Jalal as Nandita's aunt
 Laxmikant Berde as Ram Dulare Sinha
 Akshita Garud as Neha Kishore
 Mohan Joshi as Nandita's Father 
 Anant Mahadevan as DCP Krishan Kumar
 Rajpal Yadav as a School Watchmen 
 Avtar Gill as a Lawyer
 Rajendra Gupta as a Lawyer
 Dinesh Hingoo
 Achla Sachdev
 Aroon Bakshi
 Sameer Dharmadhikari
 Pushpa Varma
 Manohar Singh
 Yogi Singh

Reception

Critical response 
Indolink.com ranked the film the best film of 1999, writing " We have got to hand it to the marvelous performances and complex characters for keeping our interest in Dil Kya Kare.  They help give the film the base it needs for credibility.  If only Jha had made it a darker and less glamourous product, it would have had phenomenal success with the classes.  The masses are certainly going to have a tough time watching, understanding and appreciating this inappropriately packaged flick. Of course, for those of you who like a bit of novelty and acting tour de forces, Dil Kya Kare is better than a thousand Taals andHum Aapke Dil Mein Rehate Hain s combined. Sharmila Taliculam of Rediff wrote, "Throughout the film, one gets the feeling that Jha’s heart wasn’t in this film. It could have been a good film, if it had been treated properly. But all we can say is that it remains a disappointment."

Box office 
Dil Kya Kare grossed $285,000 in the US and £204,547 in UK. In the second weekend the film grossed $54,000 on screens, crashing to 51st position on the box-office chart from 27th. But it fared far better in the United Kingdom. It remained at No 14 there on 22 screens for two weeks.

Soundtrack

References

External links
 

1999 films
1990s Hindi-language films
Films directed by Prakash Jha
Films scored by Jatin–Lalit